Catherine Dean  may refer to:

Catherine Dean (artist) (1905–1983), British artist and educator
Catherine Dean May, U.S. Representative from Washington

See also
Kathryn Deans, Australian author
Dean (surname)